"Teary Eyed" a song by American recording artist Missy Elliott. It was written by Warryn Campbell and Elliott for her sixth studio album, The Cookbook (2005), while production was handled by the former. Released as the album's second single on September 12, 2005, the song reached the top 50 in Australia, Ireland, Switzerland, and the United Kingdom

Chart performance
In the United States, the song did not appear on the Billboard Hot 100. In the United Kingdom, the song was released on September 26, 2005, but it was also unsuccessful there, peaking at number 47. Due to the failure of the single to chart in the top 40 in the UK, it was quickly withdrawn from radio playlists. In Australia, "Teary Eyed" reached the top 40 of the ARIA Singles Chart, peaking at number 36. On the issue date of February 11, 2006, the song debuted at number 45 on the Billboard Hot Dance Club Play chart, and the following month, it peaked within the top five of the Hot Dance Singles Sales chart.

Music video
The music video for "Teary Eyed" takes place mainly in an insane asylum with Elliott in a straight jacket. In between cuts she is looking at an injured man on a hospital bed (the man she is singing about). As usual Elliot uses her sample technique to promote the song "Meltdown" by performing in the middle of the video. There are various shots of a car flipping and bursting into flames due to Elliott stabbing a hole in the front left tire out of her anger.

Track listings
 

UK CD
 "Teary Eyed" (radio version)
 "Lose Control" (Jacques Lu Cont Mix Edit; featuring Ciara & Fatman Scoop)
 "Teary Eyed" (video)

UK vinyl
 "Teary Eyed" (radio version)
 "Teary Eyed" (instrumental)
 "Teary Eyed" (a capella)
 "Lose Control" (Jacques Lu Cont Mix; featuring Ciara & Fatman Scoop)

Remixes CD
 "Teary Eyed" [Tiefschwarz Club Mix]
 "Teary Eyed" [Maurice Beats]
 "Teary Eyed" [ATFC Club Mix]
 "Teary Eyed" [ATFC Drumdub]
 "Teary Eyed" [Maurice Club Mix]
 "Teary Eyed" [Tiefschwarz Dub]
 "Teary Eyed" [Sugardip Club]
 "Teary Eyed" [Sugardip Morning After Mix]

Charts

Release history

References

2000s ballads
2005 singles
Contemporary R&B ballads
Hip hop soul songs
Missy Elliott songs
Song recordings produced by Warryn Campbell
Songs about infidelity
Songs written by Missy Elliott
Songs written by Warryn Campbell